The Awakening Land is a 1978 television miniseries based on Conrad Richter's trilogy of novels: The Trees; The Fields; and The Town, published from 1940 to 1950. The series originally aired on NBC in three installments from February 19 to February 21, 1978; directed by Boris Sagal, it starred Elizabeth Montgomery and Hal Holbrook.

Premise
The storyline follows the struggle of Sayward Luckett (Montgomery) after she travels to the unsettled Ohio Valley frontier from post-revolutionary Pennsylvania. She and her family carve out a homestead in the forest, and a community with other settlers. The series follows Sayward from a young single woman, left with three sisters to raise after their mother dies and their father abandons the family, to a married woman who has her own family of seven. Her faithful devotion to her family is recounted against the day-to-day struggle for survival.

Main cast
 Elizabeth Montgomery ...		Sayward Luckett Wheeler
 Hal Holbrook ...			Portius Wheeler 
 Jane Seymour ... Genny Luckett
 Steven Keats ...			Jake Tench
 Louise Latham ...			Jary Luckett
 William H. Macy ...		Will Beagle
 Jeanette Nolan ...			Granny McWhirter
 Bert Remsen ...			Isaac Barker
 Charles Gowan ...			Alan Hamilton
 Sean Frye ...			Resolve Wheeler, as youth
 Tracy Kleronomos ...		        Dezia Wheeler
 Katy Kurtzman ...			Rosa Tench
 Byrne Piven ...			Dr. Pearsall
 Julie Gibson ...			Lady Peddler

Production notes

Location
The series was shot in historic New Salem, Illinois.  Interiors were filmed in a set constructed in a gymnasium in Springfield, the state capital.  The gym was also used to house the prop and wardrobe departments.  Filming took  months.  As an incentive for the production company to choose the area, the Springfield city council agreed to fill a nearby lake to resemble the Ohio River. The city arranged for animals from the Elgin Zoo to be transported to the set.

Coaching of cast
The production was faithful to Richter's use of language characteristic of the Ohio Valley in those years. Actress/choreographer Marge Champion instructed the actors in both speech and body language of the region to add to the authenticity of the historical drama.

Crew
Directed by: Boris Sagal
"The Trees" and "The Fields" script: James Lee Barrett
"The Town" script: Liam O'Brien
Novels written by: Conrad Richter
Executive Producer: Harry Bernstein
Associate Producer: Robin S. Clark
Executive Producer: Tom Kuhn
Producer: Robert E. Relyea
Original Music by: Fred Karlin
 Cinematography by: Michel Hugo
 Film Editing by: Bernard J. Small
 Production Design by: Jack DeShields
Set Decoration by: Fred Price
 Costume Design by: Frank Tauss
Key Costumer: Bill Blackburn
Hair Stylist: Sugar Blymyer
Assistant Director: Alan R. Green
First Assistant Director: Dennis E. Jones
 Property Master: Matt Springman
Sound Mixer: Glenn E. Anderson
ADR Editor: Jerry Jacobson
Assistant Cameraman: Jim Mazzula
 Choreographer: Marge Champion
 Dialogue Supervisor: Marge Champion
 Extras Brian Halcomb, Allen Tomlin, Dan Yeager

Award nominations

References

External links
 Hal Erickson, The Awakening Land, The New York Times  
 

1978 drama films
1978 television films
1978 films
American drama films
1970s American television miniseries
1970s English-language films
Films based on American novels
Films set in Ohio
Films set in the 1790s
Films set in the 19th century
Films shot in Illinois
Films directed by Boris Sagal
NBC network original films
1970s American films